Jewel Cave National Monument contains Jewel Cave, currently the third longest cave in the world, with  of mapped passageways. It became a national monument in 1908.

History
Frank and Albert Michaud, two local prospectors, discovered the cave in 1900, when they felt cold air blowing out of a small hole in a canyon. It is unknown whether any previous inhabitants of the area were aware of the natural cave opening, which was not large enough for a person to enter.

After enlarging the cave entrance with dynamite, the Michaud brothers found a cavern lined with calcite crystals, which led them to name it "Jewel Cave".  The brothers tried to capitalize on the discovery, widening the opening, building walkways inside, and opening it to tourists. Although their venture was unsuccessful, news of the discovery eventually reached Washington. President Theodore Roosevelt proclaimed Jewel Cave a National Monument on February 7, 1908. The area around the natural entrance to the cave was further developed by the Civilian Conservation Corps in the 1930s. The National Park Service assumed management of the monument in 1933 and began offering tours in 1939.

That year, however, Herb and Jan Conn, local rock climbers, began exploring, and within two years had mapped . Much of the new discoveries lay outside the boundaries of the monument, under land managed by the United States Forest Service. The two agencies performed a land swap in 1965, establishing the present boundaries of the park, and enabling the development of a new part of the cave. The Park Service sunk a  elevator shaft to a previously remote cave area, and built concrete walks and metal stairs and platforms along a one-half-mile loop. The "Scenic Tour" was opened in 1972. Most modern-day visitors tour that part of the cave.  
In August 2000, an  forest fire burned 90% of the monument and the surrounding area. The visitor center and historic buildings were spared.

Exploration

Although they largely retired from caving by the early 1980s, exploration has continued unabated. Because the areas being explored take many hours to reach, explorers now sometimes camp in the cave during expeditions of as long as four days. The cave is mapped by traditional survey techniques, using compass, clinometer and today with lasers instead of tape measures.

Its  of mapped passageway make Jewel Cave the third longest cave in the world, after Mammoth Cave System in Kentucky and Sistema Sac Actun at the Yucatán Peninsula (Mexico).

The discovered areas in the cave account for only about 3 to 5% of the estimated total air volume of the cave. The cave volume is estimated by measuring the amount of air that the cave "exhales" when the outside air pressure drops and "inhales" when the outside air pressure rises.

Geology

Jewel Cave is a "breathing cave," which means air enters or exits the cave with changes in atmospheric pressure from day to night or due to changes in the weather.  This was first explained by Herb Conn in 1966.

Most of the cave formed within the Mississippian Pahasapa Limestone deposited 350 million years ago.  The later limestones, sandstones, and shales deposited in these Paleozoic and Mesozoic seas were eroded with the geologic uplift associated with Laramide Orogeny and the formation of the Black Hills.  The main passages of the cave then formed in the early Cenozoic.  Uplift continued in the Late Pliocene or Early Pleistocene lowering the water table and draining the cave.

Jewel Cave passages follow a pattern of joint development. The faults and joints are associated with the uplift of the Black Hills approximately 58 to 54 million years ago.  After main cave dissolution, a thick layer of calcite lined the walls about 2.5 million years ago.

During cave development and afterwards, speleothems and speleogens formed, including the "jewels" or spar. Other examples include stalactites, stalagmites, flowstone, cave popcorn, boxworks, helictites, scintillites, conulites, coralloids, cave pearls, rimstone, rafts, rims, vents, and frostwork.  The gypsum formations include needles, beards, cotton, hair, flowers, and spiders. Finally, Jewel Cave contains a very rare formation called a hydromagnesite balloon. Those are created when gas of an unknown source inflates a pasty substance formed by the precipitation of the magnesium carbonate hydroxide mineral.

Access
Jewel Cave is open year-round. The Park Service offers three tours: the scenic tour, a half-mile loop through a paved and lighted central portion of the cave accessible by elevator; the historic tour, a candlelight tour through the earliest-discovered part of the cave; and a wild caving tour, through an undeveloped part of the cave near the scenic loop. There are 3 surface trails varying in length and difficulty.

See also

 List of caves
List of longest caves in the United States
 List of longest caves
 List of national monuments of the United States
 Wind Cave National Park
 Mammoth Cave National Park
 Lehman Caves
 Oregon Caves National Monument
 Russell Cave National Monument
 Timpanogos Cave National Monument
 Speleology

References 

  (describes the exploration of Jewel Cave from its discovery to the mid-1980s)
 
 

Black Hills
Caves of South Dakota
Show caves in the United States
Protected areas of Custer County, South Dakota
National Park Service National Monuments in South Dakota
Protected areas established in 1908
Civilian Conservation Corps in South Dakota
1908 establishments in South Dakota
Landforms of Custer County, South Dakota